This article lists the complete results of the group stage of the 2014 Uber Cup in New Delhi, India.

Group W

China vs Russia

Chinese Taipei vs England

China vs England

Chinese Taipei vs Russia

China vs Chinese Taipei

England vs Russia

Group X

Indonesia vs Australia

Korea vs Singapore

Indonesia vs Singapore

Korea vs Australia

Korea vs Indonesia

Australia vs Singapore

Group Y

India vs Canada

Thailand vs Hong Kong

India vs Hong Kong

Thailand vs Canada

Thailand vs India

Canada vs Hong Kong

Group Z

Denmark vs Malaysia

Japan vs Germany

Japan vs Malaysia

Denmark vs Germany

Japan vs Denmark

Malaysia vs Germany

References

External links
 Uber Cup Finals 2014

2014 Thomas & Uber Cup